"Feel What You Want" is a song by American club music singer-songwriter Kristine W, released in 1994 as the first single from her debut album, Land of the Living (1996). It was produced by British producer Rollo and became a huge number-one club hit in both the UK and US. The song also reached number four in the Netherlands and number 22 in Belgium. On the Eurochart Hot 100, it peaked at number 83 in September 1994. On the UK Singles Chart, it charted three times; first time at number 33 in 1994, then at number 40 with a 1997 remix by German producer Peter Ries and last time in 2001 at number 85. "Feel What You Want" was also featured on the soundtrack of Grand Theft Auto: Liberty City Stories on the Rise FM radio station.

Background
Kristine wrote "Feel What You Want" with Rollo and Rob Dougan. When asked in an interview about how she came up with this song, she said,

Critical reception
AllMusic editor John Bush felt that on "Feel What You Want", Kristine W. proves that she probably is "the most soulful vocalist in dance music, period." Larry Flick from Billboard wrote that after being the center of a fierce major-label bidding war, "this European dance/pop smash is finally available domestically—and the odds are mighty good that it will meet with similar success here both on dancefloors and over radio airwaves. Kristine has a striking voice, and she turns in an urgent performance that transforms the house-rooted song into an anthem to be reckoned with. Will sound great on boom-boxes on the beach." William Stevensen from Entertainment Weekly declared it as an "infectious anthem". Pan-European magazine Music & Media said that "a keyboard and a voice alone usually lead to a ballad. Dance has its own rules though. If there was a prize for the most sparsely arranged pop dance record, this track would win." Andy Beevers from Music Week rated it five out of five, stating that "the uplifting and catchy song is highly distinctive." In 1997, the magazine's Alan Jones viewed it as "haunting" and "one of the finest Rollo/Sister Bliss creations". 

Michael Morley from Muzik described it as "storming". A reviewer from The Network Forty remarked that it is "displaying a unique dance groove". Ben Wener from Orange County Register called it "irresistible". People Magazine named "Feel What You Want" as the "standout cut" on the Land of the Living album, noting "the thumping house rhythm, exuberant keyboard motif and her whopping vocal". Brad Beatnik from the RM Dance Update commented, "A record that needs no introduction, suffice to say that if you haven't heard, or heard of, it by now, you must be living like a hermit. The deliciously deep, swinging tune is topped by Kristine's restrained garage vocals and is at its most upfront and moody on the Our Tribe mix." Another editor, James Hamilton, declared it as "Vegas lounge singer's Rollo & Rob-D created sparse organ stabbed expressive garage skipper". Frank Own for Vibe named it the Vocal House Cut of the Year and constated that the former Vegas lounge singer "moved the muscle boys this year with this sparse, smoldering floor filler."

Music video
A music video was produced to promote the single, directed by British director Lindy Heymann. It features Kristine W. dressed as many different characters, performing the song. Some scenes show here dressed like a clown and Elvis Presley. Heyman would also direct the video for the singer's next single, "One More Try".

Impact and legacy
DJ Magazine ranked "Feel What You Want" number 91 in their list of "Top 100 Club Tunes" in 1998.

Tomorrowland featured the song in their official list of "The Ibiza 500" in 2020.

Track listing

 12", UK (1994)
A1. "Feel What You Want" (Our Tribe Vocal) – 5:28
A2. "Feel What You Want" (Junior's Factory Dub) – 7:53
B1. "Feel What You Want" (Dignity Vocal Mix) – 8:15
B2. "Feel What You Want" (Diss-Cuss Vox) – 7:19

 12" Remixes, Germany (1997)
A. "Feel What You Want" (Dekkard's Offworld Vocal) – 12:37
B1. "Feel What You Want" (Junior's N.Y. X-Tended Vocal) – 5:59
B2. "Feel What You Want" (PeeRee's Extended) – 6:30

 CD single, UK (1994)
"Feel What You Want" (Our Tribe Vocal) – 5:28
"Feel What You Want" (Dignity Vocal Mix) – 8:15
"Feel What You Want" (Junior's Factory Mix) – 9:03
"Feel What You Want" (Kerri Chandler) – 6:10
"Feel What You Want" (Development Corp) – 7:11

 CD single, UK (1997)
"Feel What You Want" (Dekkard's Offworld Vocal Edit) – 4:38
"Feel What You Want" (Greenlight Vocal Remix Edit) – 4:19
"Feel What You Want" (Rollo's Rhythm Radio Mix Edit) – 4:34
"Feel What You Want" (Junior's N.Y. X-tended Vocal Edit) – 4:03

 CD maxi, Germany (1994)
"Feel What You Want" (Our Tribe Vocal Edit) – 4:11
"Feel What You Want" (Development Corp Edit) – 4:03
"Feel What You Want" (Our Tribe Vocal) – 5:29
"Feel What You Want" (Dignity Vocal Mix) – 8:15
"Feel What You Want" (Diss-Cuss Vox) – 7:19
"Feel What You Want" (Kerri Chandler Edit) – 4:16

 CD maxi, Netherlands (1994)
"Feel What You Want" (Our Tribe Vocal (Edit)) – 4:14
"Feel What You Want" (Our Tribe Vocal) – 5:30
"Feel What You Want" (Junior's Factory Dub) – 7:56
"Feel What You Want" (Dignity Vocal Mix) – 8:18
"Feel What You Want" (Diss-Cuss Vox) – 7:22
"Feel What You Want" (Junior's Factory Mix) – 9:06
"Feel What You Want" (Our Tribe Dub) – 4:48
"Feel What You Want" (Kerri Chandler) – 6:13
"Feel What You Want" (Development Corporation) – 7:12

 CD maxi, Scandinavia (1994)
"Feel What You Want" (Our Tribe Vocal Edit) – 4:10
"Feel What You Want" (Our Tribe Vocal) – 5:27
"Feel What You Want" (Dignity Vocal Mix) – 8:15

 Cassette single, US (1994)
A1. "Feel What You Want" (Our Tribe Vocal Radio Edit)
A2. "Feel What You Want" (Kerri Chandler Mix)
B1. "Feel What You Want" (Our Tribe Vocal Radio Edit)
B2. "Feel What You Want" (Kerri Chandler Mix)

 Cassette maxi single, US (1994)
A1. "Feel What You Want" (Our Tribe Vocal)
A2. "Feel What You Want" (Development Corporation)
B1. "Feel What You Want" (Dignity Vocal Mix)
B2. "Feel What You Want" (Junior's Factory Mix)

Personnel
Guitar by Skinny Jules
All tracks written by Rob D., Rollo & Kristine W.
Published by BMG Music/Champion Music.
Licensed from Champion Records.

Remixes
"Feel What You Want" has been remixed and released many times between 2001 and 2010 as listed below:

 "Feel What You Want" (2001 remix by Deep Swing / Pacha Mama (Olivier Berger & Stephan Luke) / Silk Machete)
 "Feel What You Want" (2004 remix by Cuba Libre)
 "Feel What You Want" (2005 remix by Musaphia & Mayhem)
 "Feel What You Want" (2006 remix by DJ Tekin)
 "Feel What You Want" (2008 remix by Mark Simmons / Razor N' Guido)
 "Feel What You Want" (2009 remix by Bingo Players / Oliver Lang & Danny Whitehead / Danny Dove & Steve Smart)

Charts

Weekly charts

Year-end charts

Cover versions
"Feel What You Want" was covered by Phonique for their Kissing Strangers album in 2010.

See also
List of number-one dance hits (United States)
List of artists who reached number one on the US Dance chart

References

1994 debut singles
1994 songs
1997 singles
2001 singles
2009 singles
Champion Records singles
Dance Pool singles
Electronic songs
House music songs
Kristine W songs
Music Week number-one dance singles
Music videos directed by Lindy Heymann
Songs written by Kristine W
Songs written by Rob Dougan
Songs written by Rollo Armstrong